Allophylastrum is a genus of flowering plants belonging to the family Sapindaceae.

Its native range is Guyana to Northern Brazil.

Species:

Allophylastrum frutescens

References

Sapindaceae
Sapindaceae genera